Moy Racing, formerly PRW Racing and Bobby Jones Racing, was an auto racing team owned by former Ford Motor Company employee Joseph Reilly which fielded entries in the NASCAR Busch Series. Drivers who piloted the Moy Racing Ford include Jimmy Kitchens, Andy Kirby, Carl Long, Bruce Bechtel, Dana White, Brad Teague, Ed Berrier, Donnie Neuenberger, Shane Hall, Kertus Davis, Jeff McClure, Jason Rudd, Chris Diamond, Eric Jones, Ken Alexander, Mike Harmon, Shane Huffman, Kelly Denton, Derek Hayes, and Kieran Dynes.

External links
 

American auto racing teams
Defunct NASCAR teams